Pipilika was a search engine operated from Sylhet, Bangladesh. The search engine is no longer operating.

It is the country's first Bangla search engine developed by the Computer Science and Engineering students of Shahjalal University of Science and Technology, Sylhet, Bangladesh as a thesis project. It has ability to search both in Bengali and English language. Pipilika is the country's first and only search engine that can search both Bangla and English. But it is no longer in operation . It searches and automatically characterizes Bangla and English newspapers of the country, blog sites, Bangla Wikipedia and government websites. It prioritizes Bangla information over English. 

It used to have five categories:
 All
 News
 Blog
 Bangla Wikipedia
 National E-Infokosh
The Computer Science & Engineering Department of Shahjalal University of Science and Technology, Sylhet and Grameenphone IT Limited have jointly innovated the Bangla search engine Pipilika.com.

External links 
 All the Internet
 Wayback machine

References

Internet search engines
Websites which mirror Wikipedia
Online companies of Bangladesh